Vladislav Felitsianovich Khodasevich (16 May 1886 – 14 June 1939) was an influential Russian poet and literary critic who presided over the Berlin circle of Russian emigre litterateurs.

Life and career
Khodasevich was born in Moscow into a family of Felitsian Khodasevich (Polish: Felicjan Chodasiewicz), a Polish nobleman, and Sofiia Iakovlevna (née Brafman), a woman of Jewish descent whose family had converted to Christianity. His grandfather Jacob Brafman was famous as a Jewish convert to Russian Orthodoxy who authored The Book of the Kahal (1869), a polemical forerunner of the Protocols of the Elders of Zion. He left the Moscow University after understanding that poetry was his true vocation. Khodasevich's first collections of poems, Youth (1907) and A Happy Little House (1914), were subsequently discarded by him as immature.

 
In the year 1917, Khodasevich gained wider renown by writing a superb short piece The Way of Corn, a reflection on the biblical image of wheat as a plant that cannot live if it does not first die. This poem is eponymous with Khodasevich's best known collection of verse, first published in 1920 and revised in 1922.

Patronized by Maxim Gorky, Khodasevich and his wife Nina Berberova (herself a distinguished littérateur, 1901–1993) left Russia for Gorky's villa in Sorrento, Italy. Later they moved to Berlin, where they took up with Andrei Bely. Khodasevich's complicated relationship with this maverick genius ended with a scandalous rupture, followed by the latter's return to Moscow. In his memoirs, Bely presented an unforgettable, expressionistic, and very partial portrayal of Khodasevich.

During his first years in Berlin, Khodasevich wrote his two last and most metaphysical collections of verse, Heavy Lyre (1923) and European Night (1927). The former contained the most important rendition of the Orpheus theme in Russian poetry, the esoteric Ballad. Khodasevich did not align himself with any of the aesthetic movements of the day, claiming Alexander Pushkin to be his only model. He even penned several scholarly articles exploring the master-stroke of the great Russian poet.

In the mid-1920s, Khodasevich switched his literary activities from poetry to criticism. He joined Mark Aldanov and Alexander Kerensky as the co-editor of the Berlin periodical Days, in which he would publish his penetrating analyses of the contemporary Soviet literature. He also indulged in a prolonged controversy with the Parisian emigre pundits, such as Georgy Adamovich and Georgy Ivanov, on various issues of literary theory. As an influential critic, Khodasevich did his best to encourage the career of Vladimir Nabokov, who would always cherish his memory.

Despite a physical infirmity that gradually took hold of him, Khodasevich worked relentlessly during the last decade of his life. Most notably, he wrote an important biography of Gavrila Derzhavin (translated into English and published by University of Wisconsin Press in 2007) in 1931, which he attempted to style in the language of Pushkin's epoch. Several weeks before Khodasevich's death, his brilliant book of memoirs, Necropolis, was published. Although severely partisan, the book is invaluable for its ingenious characterizations of Maxim Gorky, Andrei Bely, and Mikhail Gershenzon. He died from cancer of the liver in 1939.

English translations
Necropolis, Columbia University Press, 2019 (The Russian Library). Translated by Sarah Vitali.
 Khodasevich, Vladislav. 2014. Selected Poems, 1st Edition. Peter Daniels (Translator), Michael Wachtel (Introduction). The Overlook Press. 2014. ,  (Parallel text in Russian and English)
 Khodasevich, Vladislav. Derzhavin: A Biography. Angela Brintlinger (Translator). University of Wisconsin Press. 2007. ISBN 978-0-299-22420-2

See  also
Viktor Strazhev
Georgy Chulkov

References

External links
 English translations of 4 blank verse poems, "November the 2nd," "Midday," "Encounter," and "House" in The Hopkins Review
  The Poems by Vladislav Khodasevich
  

1886 births
1939 deaths
Russian people of Jewish descent
Russian male poets
Russian people of Polish descent
20th-century Russian poets
20th-century Russian male writers
20th-century Russian journalists
Russian memoirists
Russian expatriates in Germany